The Horse Whisperer is a 1998 American Western drama film directed by and starring Robert Redford, based on the 1995 novel The Horse Whisperer by Nicholas Evans. Redford plays the title role, a talented trainer with a remarkable gift for understanding horses, who is hired to help an injured teenager (played by Scarlett Johansson) and her horse back to health following a tragic accident.

The film was released on May 15, 1998. It received generally positive reviews from critics and grossed close to $187 million worldwide.

Plot 
In Lake Luzerne, New York, teenager Grace MacLean and her best friend Judith go out early one winter's morning to ride their horses, Pilgrim and Gulliver. As they ride up an icy slope, Gulliver slips and hits Pilgrim. Both horses fall, dragging the girls onto a road and get hit by a tractor-trailer. Judith and Gulliver are killed, while Grace and Pilgrim are both severely injured.

Grace, left with a partially amputated right leg, is bitter and withdrawn after the accident. Meanwhile, Pilgrim is traumatized and uncontrollable to the extent that it is suggested he be put down. Grace's mother Annie, a strong-minded and workaholic magazine editor, refuses to allow it; sensing that somehow Grace's recovery is linked with Pilgrim's.

Desperate for a way to heal both Grace and Pilgrim, Annie tracks down a "horse whisperer", Tom Booker, in the remote Montana mountains. Tom agrees to help, but only if Grace also takes part in the process. Grace reluctantly agrees, and she and Annie go to stay at the Booker ranch where Tom lives with his brother and his brother's family.

As Pilgrim and Grace slowly overcome their trauma, Annie and Tom begin to develop a mutual attraction. However, they are both reluctant to act on these feelings – Annie is married and Tom had his heart broken before (his wife left him because she belonged in the city). Tom also asks Grace to tell him what happened with her and Pilgrim to understand what Pilgrim is feeling. At first, Grace is reluctant, but eventually gathers up her courage, and tearfully describes the accident.

The status quo between Annie and Tom is broken when Robert MacLean, Grace's father and Annie's husband, unexpectedly shows up at the ranch. Annie is increasingly torn by her feelings for Tom and her love for her family. Soon, with Tom's help, Grace finally takes the last step to heal herself and Pilgrim – riding Pilgrim again. As the MacLeans get ready to leave the ranch, Robert tells Annie that he knows he loved her more than she loved him, and that if he could be a better father, husband, or lawyer then it didn't matter, he did it all for the love he had for her. He felt that he didn't need more, he knows she is not sure how she feels about him, and now he wants her to make a choice, and not to come home until she is sure.

Although Annie wishes she could stay with Tom on the ranch, she also knows that she belongs to the city, just like Tom's wife. Annie departs, driving away from the ranch, while Tom watches her go from the top of a hill.

Cast

Betty Buckley appeared as an ex-girlfriend of Tom Booker but was cut from the film.

Background
Although he had already directed several films, this was the first time Robert Redford directed a film that he also starred in.

The main character, according to writer Nicholas Evans, is modeled after horse whisperers Tom Dorrance, Ray Hunt and, in particular, their younger disciple Buck Brannaman. Brannaman also doubled for Robert Redford in the film and served as the consultant. Redford likewise assisted in the production of the documentary Buck. Evans said, "Others have claimed to be the inspiration for Tom Booker in The Horse Whisperer. The one who truly inspired me was Buck Brannaman. His skill, understanding and his gentle, loving heart have parted the clouds for countless troubled creatures. Buck is the Zen master of the horse world."

Horse training methods and controversies
The schooling administered to the traumatized horse is faithful to a number of basic natural horsemanship techniques, although the portrayal in the film does not follow the specific method of any one practitioner. Nicholas Evans writes: "I spent many weeks traveling across the West and met three amazing horsemen: Tom Dorrance, Ray Hunt and Buck Brannaman."

The horse training methods shown are not entirely without controversy. While Brannaman was the on-site technical consultant, he did not have creative control. The constraints of film-making required a number of sequences to be edited for length, thus not showing some critical training elements that would normally be used. A few basic safety problems in the film include Redford kneeling in front of a horse known to charge humans in one scene, and wearing a large ring on his finger while training in another, a risky practice in the real world when simultaneously handling a dangerous horse and a rope.

A fundamental literary device used that goes against basic horse psychology was that of having Pilgrim, apparently a well-trained horse, suddenly became a vicious rogue following a single traumatic event. A horse may have a strong reaction after an accident if the elements that preceded the trauma are repeated at a future time (for example, it would be reasonable for Pilgrim to have developed a fear of vehicles, of crossing a road, or of climbing a steep slope), but not generally a complete change in personality, manner and outlook in the way that can occur in traumatized humans. Such behavioral changes in a horse would normally be the result of sustained, long-term animal abuse.

A practitioner of natural horsemanship, John Lyons, provided an equestrian's critique of the film, noting that while there were many positive messages, there was also the potential for people to get some dangerous messages about horse training from certain sequences. He first noted that the multiple horses that played Pilgrim were all well-trained animals and that the movie did not represent a real-life time frame for training a single real-life animal. He pointed out that the film made the rehabilitation of the horse appear to be a one-session event, when in reality it would take considerable time for such a change to occur. Lyons criticized a number of dangerous practices shown in the movie, and was particularly critical of the scene where Booker hobbles, ropes, and lays the exhausted horse on the ground, then has Grace get on the recumbent horse, which is then allowed to rise, and the horse and girl miraculously are both cured of their fears and once again a horse and rider team. He argued that the actual real-life practical risk of injury to horse and human in such a method is considerable, that a horse pushed to exhaustion is not "trained", and pushing a fearful rider in such a fashion is ill-advised. However, Lyons' critique also recognized the limitations of Hollywood film-making, stating, "In order to tell a story, things are often done that would be imprudent for horse owners to attempt."

Reception

Box office 
The Horse Whisperer grossed $74.4 million in the United States and Canada, and $111.5 million in other territories, for a worldwide total of $186.9 million.

In its opening weekend the film made $13.7 million and finished in second, then made $14.5 million and $7.5 million the following two weekends.

Critical response 
On Rotten Tomatoes the film holds an approval rating of 74% based on 57 reviews, with an average rating of 6.96/10. The website's critics consensus reads: "It might be a bit too eager to tug the heartstrings, but The Horse Whisperer is typically graceful, well-crafted Redford—on both sides of the camera." At Metacritic the film has a weighted average score of 65 out of 100, based on 19 critics, indicating "generally favorable reviews". Audiences polled by CinemaScore gave the film an average grade of "A−" on an A+ to F scale.

Janet Maslin in The New York Times says that the film "sustains great visual intensity thanks to Robert Richardson's majestic cinematography" but its "rock-solid values" are diluted by "a misconceived ending", whereas CNN in a rather sarcastic review complains that the storytelling was "all done very, very slowly" and mentions the film's length. Film critics Gene Siskel and Roger Ebert gave the film "two thumbs up" on their weekly TV show At the Movies. Leonard Maltin gave the film three and a half stars out of a possible four, and called the film an "exquisite rendering of Evans' novel".

The song "A Soft Place to Fall" by Allison Moorer and Gwil Owen was nominated for the Academy Award for Best Original Song. Moorer performs the song in the movie. The film was nominated for Best Motion Picture – Drama and Redford for Best Director at the 56th Golden Globe Awards.

In popular culture
The movie's popularity led to the word "whisperer" being coined as a slang term for anyone with a strong affinity for a particular animal or being.
 In the 2015 biographical feature film Steve Jobs, Apple CEO John Sculley (Jeff Daniels) has a talk with Steve Jobs (Michael Fassbender) because Jobs is perceived to be difficult to communicate with, and Sculley is perceived to be a "Steve whisperer".

See also 
John Solomon Rarey, early nineteenth century horse whisperer

References

External links
 
 
 
 

1998 drama films
1998 films
American drama films
1990s English-language films
Films about horses
Films directed by Robert Redford
Films set in Montana
Films set in New York (state)
Films shot in Montana
Films shot in New York (state)
Touchstone Pictures films
Films scored by Thomas Newman
Films with screenplays by Eric Roth
Films based on British novels
Films based on American novels
Films about mother–daughter relationships
1990s American films
Films about disability